Punyam Aham is a 2010 Indian Malayalam-language film directed by Raj Nair. Prithviraj, Samvrutha Sunil and Nedumudi Venu play the lead roles in this film.

Plot 
Punyam Aham is set in a small village in northern Kerala. The protagonist is Narayan Unni, a young man with a Brahmin father and low-caste mother, who separated, leaving the mother to raise him alone. The film tells the story of Unni leaving home and searching for his identity, and then repeating many of his father's mistakes in life. It is based on the story in traditional folklore about Naranath Bhranthan and his father Vararuchi.

Cast 

 Prithviraj Sukumaran as Naarayanan Unni
 Samvrutha Sunil as Jayasree
 Nedumudi Venu as Kaarackal Easwaran Namboodiri
 Nishanth Sagar as Georgekutty
 Sona Nair as Eldest Sister
 K. P. A. C. Lalitha as Jayasree's Amma
 M. R. Gopakumar as Pappanassar
Sreejith Ravi as Pankan
Sreekala VK as Narayanan's mother
Roselin
Binda as Younger sister

Production 
Punyam Aham was the directorial debut of Raj Nair, the grandson of novelist Thakazhi Shivashankara Pillai. Filming began in January 2009 at Ottapalam, then shifted to Kuttanad. It premiered at the Mumbai International Film Festival in October 2010.

Critical reception 
Paresh C. Palicha writing for Rediff Movies criticised the plot as "too intellectual".

References

External links 

 Punyam Aham on OneIndia.in

2010 films
2010s Malayalam-language films
Films shot in Kannur
Films shot in Thalassery
Films shot in Kozhikode
Films shot in Ottapalam
Films shot in Alappuzha